Barry John MBE is a Welsh soldier and artist. He served in the British armed forces for over 20 years. In the 2010 New Years Honours List Barry John was awarded the MBE.  He is mainly an abstract artist. Through his work he expresses stories, memories, demons, harsh and sometimes brutal truths and the beauty, colours and resilience of a conflicted world.

Barry John was born in Neyland, Pembrokeshire and was a pupil at Sir Thomas Picton School, Haverfordwest before joining the Army at the age of 16. The experiences he has had during his service have formed most of the content of his art.

For a time, Barry worked as a recruiting officer in Haverfordwest, but later rejoined the Welsh Regiment.

In 2013, Barry organised the Neyland Armistice Project, a collaborative art project to commemorate the 100th anniversary of the First World War.

After 24 years of service in the Army, Barry set up The VC Gallery in 2014.

The VC Gallery 
The VC Gallery is a charity based at 30 High Street Haverfordwest, Pembrokeshire. Barry had experience during his service of mental health work and PTSD and, combined with his artistic skills, he realised a need in his community for such a charity to use art to help overcome issues faced by veterans. The Gallery focuses on working with veterans, older people, children and anyone in the local community who feels they need time out to express themselves through art and creativity. As Barry says, "its all about socialising, community and art."

Artwork and Exhibitions 
Barry has held many solo art exhibitions throughout the UK and Europe and many group exhibitions including the John Creasey Museum in Salisbury and Exeter Castle. He has also exhibited in the Waterfront Gallery, Milford Haven, with an exhibition titled 'Homecoming', opened by Andrew Vicari. At the Mall Gallery, London, in the Armed Forces exhibition with Prince Charles and opened by the then Secretary of Defense, where Barry was presented with the Templar Award for Art. Barry did a number of powerful pieces at the Art of Remembrance showing work on the Welsh at Mametz Wood. His work has also been auctioned as part of the Square Mile Salute. In 2017 he won an award for community work with at the Pride of Britain Awards and has won a Local Heros award for art three times.

In August 2017 Barry held a solo exhibition at the Late November Gallery, Haverfordwest, opened by the former New York Times art critic, John Russell Taylor.  In February 2018 Barry held a solo art exhibition called 'Remains of the Day' at Tenby Museum and Art Gallery. The exhibition featured a number of works including examples of his 'black graffiti' and Geisha girls.

His themes can be challenging, often including riots and terrorism, but Barry's art reflects the challenge that he sees in life. The forms, shapes, colour and execution of his work represent being brave in art. Barry's work has been compared to Jean-Michel Basquiat, painting in a similar neo-expressionist style, stemming from the tradition of graffiti and street art.

Barry now has works in museums and galleries including Kooywood Gallery, Cardiff, Pure Art, Milford Haven, Broadway Luxury Gallery, Cotswolds, and the Fleek Gallery in Devon.  His work is in many private collections; most notably actor Rhys Ifans, world-title boxer Gavin Rees and Chef Raymond Blanc amongst others.

References

External links 
 Barry John's website
 The VC Gallery

Welsh artists
Year of birth missing (living people)
Living people
Members of the Order of the British Empire